The 2014 Women's EuroHockey Indoor Nations Championship - Division II was a lower division of EuroHockey Indoor Nations Championship, that was played on January 24–26, 2014 in Šiauliai, Lithuania. The winner and runner up got promoted to 2016 Women's EuroHockey Indoor Nations Championship, while the last place holder got relegated to 2016 Women's EuroHockey Indoor Nations Championship - Division III.

Results

Group A

Group B

5th-8th place Group

Medal Group

Final ranking

References

External links

2014
Sport in Šiauliai
International women's field hockey competitions hosted by Lithuania
EuroHockey Indoor Championship II
EuroHockey Indoor Championship II
EuroHockey Indoor Championship II
Women 2